Roadwar Europa is a 1987 video game designed by Jeffrey Johnson, developed by George MacDonald, and published by Strategic Simulations. The game was released for Amiga, Apple II, Atari ST, Commodore 64, and DOS.  The game is a sequel to the 1986 video game Roadwar 2000, which was also published by Strategic Simulations.

Gameplay
Roadwar Europa is a game in which the player is the leader of a small gang of road warriors driving across the continent in search of ticking atom bombs planted by terrorists.

Reception

SSI sold 18,765 copies of Roadwar Europa in North America.

Antic in 1988 stated "I loved the original version of this game and I love this sequel," citing its "simple and hypnotic" game play, user interface with both simple and complex options, and lack of copy protection. In the 1992 and 1994 surveys Computer Gaming World gave the title two-plus stars of five, calling it "Quite entertaining when originally released, but its graphics have rendered it obsolescent".

Robbie Robberson reviewed Roadwar Europa in Space Gamer/Fantasy Gamer No. 81. Robberson commented that "In short, the Roadwar series is an example of a good idea that is short circuited by its components. If Strategic Simulations, Inc. can release these games with a better and quicker combat routine, or better yet, reduce the incidence of combat, these games would be a required addition to every serious computer gamer's library. As of now, they are simply entertaining in the short run, and tedious in the long."

References

External links

Roadwar Europa at Atari Mania
Review in Atari Explorer

1987 video games
Amiga games
Apple II games
Atari ST games
Commodore 64 games
DOS games
Single-player video games
Strategic Simulations games
Turn-based strategy video games
Video games about bomb disposal
Video games developed in the United States
Video games set in Europe
Westwood Studios games